The Albena Cup was an invitational competition for women's football (soccer) teams held in Albena, Bulgaria. Contested by both clubs and national teams, it was originally named Grand Hotel Varna Tournament and the first two editions were held indoor.

List of finals

Other contestants

 
  (1991)
 
 
 
 
 
  Russian SFSR
 
 
  CSKA Sofia
  Beijing
  Millwall Lionesses (1989)
  Pakhtakor Tashkent

References

International women's association football invitational tournaments
Women's football friendly trophies
Recurring sporting events established in 1988
Women's football in Bulgaria